David Valentine Lawrence (nicknamed Syd) (born 28 January 1964) is a former English cricketer, who played in five Tests and one ODI for England from 1988 to 1992.

Lawrence was a popular, wholehearted and powerfully-built fast bowler, before a particularly horrific knee injury curtailed his career.

Life and career
Born in Gloucester, England to Jamaican parents, by the age of 17 he was playing for Gloucestershire, opening the bowling with Courtney Walsh.  His vigorous bowling action generated great pace, although at times he was also prone to inaccuracy. He toured Sri Lanka with an England 'B' side in 1985-6.

Lawrence was certainly one of the fastest bowlers in domestic cricket of his era. During the 1988 season, in a match against the touring West Indies, in gloomy conditions at Bristol, a delivery from Lawrence struck batter Phil Simmons on the head. Simmons had not been wearing a helmet, and his heart stopped beating as he was rushed to hospital for emergency brain surgery; he made a full recovery. Later that season Lawrence came into the England team for the one-off Test match against Sri Lanka. Although he finished on the winning side in that Test, England's first victory in a Test match for nearly two years, with the emergence of Devon Malcolm he did not force his way back into the team until the Trent Bridge Test of 1991.  The West Indies were then the opponents, so that Lawrence faced up to the recovered Simmons again, dismissing him in the second innings. Lawrence then took his only Test five-wicket haul, 5 for 106, at The Oval, contributing to England's series-levelling win in the Fifth Test. To Lawrence fell the distinction of being the last bowler to dismiss Viv Richards in Test cricket. He retained his place for another subsequent match against Sri Lanka. He also played his only one-day international that season at Lord's, returning the best bowling figures in the match, 4 for 67 in 11 eventful overs, including his Gloucestershire colleague Walsh among his wickets. As of July 2022 these remain the best bowling figures recorded by a bowler who played only one one-day international.

Having just established himself as part of England's primary bowling strikeforce, he suffered a knee injury on 10 February 1992, in Wellington, New Zealand, while playing his fifth Test for his country. In the middle of his delivery stride, his left patella (knee cap) shattered, the noise of it reaching as far as the boundary; spectators said the sound of his knee splitting was "like a pistol shot". Lawrence collapsed to the ground screaming, and was eventually carried from the field on a stretcher, comforted by team mate Ian Botham. Despite two come-back attempts for his county, including the first after a full thirteen months of recuperation, when the knee cracked yet again during a gymnasium work-out, he was never able to play for England again and was eventually forced to retire from the sport at the age of 29. Later he made a career for himself in bodybuilding.

References

External links

1964 births
Living people
England Test cricketers
England One Day International cricketers
English cricketers
Gloucestershire cricketers
Cricketers from Gloucester
English people of Jamaican descent
Black British sportsmen
Marylebone Cricket Club cricketers
Test and County Cricket Board XI cricketers